Nanci Chambers  is a Canadian-born American actress.

Biography
Chambers is perhaps best known for her role as the ambitious Lieutenant Loren Singer on the television series JAG.  Chambers has been a board member of the organisation "A Better LA". Nanci and her husband are staunch environmental conservationists, having often spent time in Ecuador learning about the tribes and rainforest. The couple sold their house in Palm Desert for US$1.1 million, since they were unable to spend time there. Chambers has been involved in the All-American Heavyweights.

Personal life
Chambers married actor David James Elliott in 1992. They have a daughter, Stephanie (b. 1993) and a son, Wyatt.

Filmography
Ghost Whisperer (TV) (2008) .... Terry
The Stranger I Married (TV) (2005) .... Dr. Janice Golding
Code 11-14 (TV) (2003) .... Det. Andrea McInroy
JAG (TV) (40 episodes) (1997–2003) .... Lt. Loren Singer/Megan O'Hara/Jojo
Dodson's Journey (2001) (TV) .... Becky
Beyond Belief: Fact or Fiction (TV) (Curse) (2000) .... Dr. Marian John
L.A. Heat (TV) (Death House) (1999) TV episode .... Jane Clark
Street Legal (TV) (The Legacy of Stanley Wall) (1991) .... Nick's Girlfriend
Screwballs (1983) .... Trisha

References

External links

Living people
American television actresses
Canadian television actresses
Place of birth missing (living people)
Canadian emigrants to the United States
Canadian expatriate actresses in the United States
Year of birth missing (living people)
21st-century American women